José Antonio Rojo (1923-1995) was a Spanish film editor. He worked on more than two hundred films during his career.

Selected filmography
 Mare Nostrum (1948)
 Just Any Woman (1949)
 Saturday Night (1950)
 The Black Crown (1951)
 Our Lady of Fatima (1951)
 From Madrid to Heaven (1952)
 The Song of Sister Maria (1952)
 Airport (1953)
I Was a Parish Priest. (1953)
 He Died Fifteen Years Ago (1954)
 An Andalusian Gentleman (1954)
 Judas' Kiss (1954)
 The Cock Crow (1955)
 The Other Life of Captain Contreras (1955)
 The Big Lie (1956)
 Miracle of the White Suit (1956)
 We Thieves Are Honourable (1956)
 Las chicas de la Cruz Roja (1958)
 The Dance (1959)
 Luxury Cabin (1959)
 My Street (1960)
 Plácido (1961)
 The Gang of Eight (1962)
 Aragonese Nobility (1965)
 Seven Dollars on the Red (1966)
 The Wild Ones of San Gil Bridge (1966)
 Pepa Doncel (1969)
 A Decent Adultery  (1969)
 More Dollars for the MacGregors (1970)
 The Rebellious Novice (1971)
 The Girl from the Red Cabaret (1973)
 The Marriage Revolution (1974)
 Blood and Sand (1989)

References

Bibliography 
 Peter Cowie & Derek Elley. World Filmography: 1967. Fairleigh Dickinson University Press, 1977.

External links 
 

1923 births
1995 deaths
Spanish film editors